The Canton of Preuilly-sur-Claise is a former canton situated in the Indre-et-Loire département and in the Centre region of France. It was disbanded following the French canton reorganisation which came into effect in March 2015. It consisted of 8 communes, which joined the canton of Descartes in 2015. It had 5,077 inhabitants (2012).

The canton comprised the following communes:

Bossay-sur-Claise
Boussay
Chambon
Charnizay
Chaumussay
Preuilly-sur-Claise
Tournon-Saint-Pierre
Yzeures-sur-Creuse

Population

See also 
 Arrondissements of the Indre-et-Loire department
 Cantons of the Indre-et-Loire department
 Communes of the Indre-et-Loire department

Notes 

Preuilly-sur-Claise
2015 disestablishments in France
States and territories disestablished in 2015